The Breed Holds Good is a 1918 novel by Arthur Wright. It had been serialised in 1916-17.

Plot
Frank Lindsay, a squatter's son, falls in with a bad crowd during World War I.

Reception
The Age said "the book has vigor, and the patriotic note is sounded effectively."

References

External links
The Breed Holds Good at AustLit
Serialisation of story in World's News 1916-17 - 23 Dec, 30 Dec, 6 Jan, 13 Jan, 20 Jan, 27 Jan, 3 Feb, 10 Feb, 17 Feb, 24 Feb, 3 March, 10 March

1918 Australian novels
Novels set during World War I